The 1991 Nebraska Cornhuskers football team represented the University of Nebraska–Lincoln in the 1991 NCAA Division I-A football season. The team was coached by Tom Osborne and played their home games in Memorial Stadium in Lincoln, Nebraska.

Schedule

Roster and coaching staff

Depth chart

Game summaries

Utah State

Colorado State

Washington

Arizona State

Oklahoma State

Kansas State

Missouri

Colorado

Kansas

Iowa State

Oklahoma

Miami (FL)

Rankings

Awards

NFL and pro players
The following Nebraska players who participated in the 1991 season later moved on to the next level and joined a professional or semi-pro team as draftees or free agents.

References

Nebraska
Nebraska Cornhuskers football seasons
Big Eight Conference football champion seasons
Nebraska Cornhuskers football